Ko Yu-ting (born 18 January 1994) is a Taiwanese football player.

International goals

U19

U23

References

External links 

 
 

1994 births
Living people
Taiwanese footballers
Chinese Taipei international footballers
Association football forwards
Taiwanese expatriate footballers
Tatung F.C. players
Changchun Yatai F.C. players
Footballers from Taipei